Sebastiano Pisani (16 October 1630 – 5 August 1690) was a Roman Catholic prelate who was Bishop of Verona (1668–1690).

Biography
Pisani was born in Venice, Italy on 16 October 1630 and ordained a priest on 22 September 1668.
On 10 December 1668, he was appointed during the papacy of Pope Clement IX as Bishop of Verona.
On 16 December 1668, he was consecrated bishop by Pietro Vito Ottoboni, Cardinal-Priest of San Marco, with Giacomo Altoviti, Titular Patriarch of Antioch, and Stefano Brancaccio, Titular Archbishop of Hadrianopolis in Haemimonto, as co-consecrators. 
He was Bishop of Verona until his death on 5 August 1690.

While bishop, he was the principal consecrator of Francesco Alberti di Poja, Bishop of Trento (1678).

References

External links and additional sources
 (for Chronology of Bishops) 
 (for Chronology of Bishops) 

17th-century Roman Catholic bishops in the Republic of Venice
Bishops appointed by Pope Clement IX
1630 births
1690 deaths